Bop for Miles is 2004 live album by Mark Murphy, recorded in tribute to trumpeter Miles Davis.

Recorded live in Vienna in 1990, the final track, "Miles", was recorded in 1999.

Reception

The Allmusic review by Thom Jurek states: "As is typical of Murphy, his readings of these tunes are seminal. His attention to color and nuance in a ballad like 'Summertime' is just plain canny: he seems to coax the emotion out of the tune from underneath it, from someplace it was hidden away from view. As Murphy seamlessly changes tempos, keys, and vocal styles without blinking, the poetry gives way to burning scat and improv. A live gig by a master, this is worth seeking out."

Track listing
 "All Blues" (Miles Davis) - 6:44
 "Summertime" (George Gershwin, Ira Gershwin, DuBose Heyward) - 4:08
 "Autumn Leaves" (Joseph Kosma, Johnny Mercer, Jacques Prévert) - 3:35
 "Bye Bye Blackbird" (Mort Dixon, Al Henderson) - 6:03
 "On Green Dolphin Street" (Bronislaw Kaper, Ned Washington) - 7:22
 "My Ship" (I. Gershwin, Kurt Weill) - 3:10
 "Farmer's Market" (Art Farmer, Annie Ross) - 7:30
 "Goodbye Pork Pie Hat" (Charles Mingus) - 5:01
 "Parker's Mood" (Charlie Parker) - 5:48
 "Milestones" (Davis) - 5:25
 "Miles" (Mark Murphy) - 2:59

Personnel
Mark Murphy - vocals, arranger
Achim Tang - double bass
Peter Mihelich - piano
Allan Praskin - saxophone
Vito Lesczak - drums
Production
Katherine Miller - engineer
Joe Fields - producer
Ira Yuspeh - engineer
Bill Milkowski - liner notes

References

HighNote Records albums
Miles Davis tribute albums
Mark Murphy (singer) live albums
2004 live albums